The NS timetable 2010 is the timetable of Nederlandse Spoorwegen that was effective on 13 December 2009. This is the train plan for all of the Netherlands.

New stations
 Amsterdam Science Park (between Amsterdam Muiderpoort and Diemen)
 Maarheeze (between Heeze and Weert)
 Sassenheim (between Leiden Centraal and Nieuw Vennep)

Changes

Amersfoort
 Intercity 1500 (Amsterdam Centraal - Amersfoort) - This service is extended to Amersfoort Schothorst. This service no longer continues to Deventer in the peak hours. It is also planned to link this service to Intercity 4500, giving a direct connection between Enkhuizen and Hoorn with Hilversum and Amersfoort.
 Intercity 2800 (Rotterdam Centraal - Amersfoort Schothorst) no longer operates between Amersfoort and Amersfoort Schothorst. This service continues to Deventer at peak times.
 Stoptrein 5800 (Uitgeest - Amersfoort Vathorst no longer operates between Amsterdam Centraal and Uitgeest. This service does not call at Amsterdam Science Park.

Amsterdam
 Intercity 1500 (Amsterdam Centraal - Amersfoort) is extended to Amersfoort Schothorst and joined up with the Intercity 4500 (Enkhuizen - Amsterdam Centraal).
 Sprinter 7400 (Breukelen - Rheden) operates to Amsterdam Centraal and Uitgeest in the peak hours as 14700.

Amsterdam–Utrecht
 Stoptrein 4000 (Amsterdam Centraal - Rotterdam Centraal) is no longer connected with the Intercity 4500 to Hoorn and Enkhuizen and instead continues as a Stoptrein to Uitgeest again.
 Sprinter 7400 (Breukelen - Rheden) operates to Amsterdam Centraal, and continues from there as 14700 to Uitgeest, in the peak hours. Towards Rheden this service does not call at Amsterdam Muiderpoort and Amsterdam Amstel, to allow the ICE to Germany to pass further along the line.
 Sprinter 17400 (Amsterdam Centraal - Veenendaal Centrum no longer operates between Breukelen and Amsterdam Centraal in the peak hours.

Weesp–Lelystad
 Stoptrein 4300 (Hoofddorp - Amsterdam Zuid - Lelystad Centrum) except mornings, evenings and Sundays does not operate between Almere Oostvaarders and Lelystad Centrum.
 Sprinter 4700 (Uitgeest - Almere Oostvaarders) does not operate between Amsterdam Centraal and Uitgeest. The service was renumbered 4600.
 Intercity 4900 (Almere Oostvaarders - Utrecht Centraal) does not operate between Almere Centrum and Almere Oostvaarders.
 Intercity 14300 (Schiphol - Amsterdam Zuid - Lelystad Centrum) operates from 07.00 - 20.00 Monday to Saturday. It was renumbered 3700.

Schiphol–Berlin
 Intercity 140 (Schiphol - Berlin (-Szezcin) is extended to Den Haag Centraal from Schiphol. It stops at Leiden Centraal.

Zwolle–Enschede
 For major works on the line the services were cut as follows until 2012:
 Stoptrein 7900 Nijverdal - Enschede
 Stoptrein 17900 Zwolle - Nijverdal West (temporary station)
The stations were connected by a bus service.

Groningen–Zwolle
 Stoptrein 9100 (Groningen - Zwolle) operates twice per hour (Monday - Friday), It remains once per hour on weekends.
 Intercity 700 (Groningen - Schiphol) only stops at Assen between Groningen and Zwolle. On weekends this service stops at all stations between Groningen and Zwolle.
 Stoptrein 2900 (Leeuwarden - Wolvega is extended to Zwolle from Wolvega in the peak hours.

Amsterdam–Haarlem–Rotterdam–Dordrecht–Breda
 The Sneltrein 2200 is an Intercity.
 From 22.00 the service starts/finishes at Leiden Centraal rather than Amsterdam Centraal. This train no longer operates between Dordrecht and Breda and also does not call at Rotterdam Lombardijen.

Passenger rail transport in the Netherlands
Nederlandse Spoorwegen
2009 in rail transport